Liolaemus pleopholis is a species of lizard in the family Iguanidae.  It is from Chile.

References

pleopholis
Lizards of South America
Reptiles of Chile
Endemic fauna of Chile
Reptiles described in 1998
Taxa named by Raymond Laurent